Melissia Elie (born 12 November 1991) is an American-born Guyanese former footballer who played as a forward and a midfielder. She has been a member of the Guyana women's national football team.

Early life
Elie was raised in Brentwood, New York.

International career
Elie capped for Guyana at senior level during the 2010 CONCACAF Women's World Cup Qualifying qualification.

See also
List of Guyana women's international footballers

References

1991 births
Living people
Guyanese women's footballers
Guyana women's international footballers
Women's association football forwards
Women's association football midfielders
American women's soccer players
Soccer players from New York (state)
Sportspeople from Suffolk County, New York
African-American women's soccer players
American sportspeople of Guyanese descent
College women's soccer players in the United States
Farmingdale State Rams athletes
People from Brentwood, New York
21st-century African-American sportspeople
21st-century African-American women